The Izbica massacre was one of the largest massacres of the Kosovo War. Following the war, the International Criminal Tribunal for the former Yugoslavia (ICTY) found that the massacre resulted in the deaths of about 93 Kosovo Albanians, mostly male non-combatants between the ages of 60 and 70.

Background
During the Kosovo War, Izbica was considered safe for Kosovo Albanians from neighboring areas to take refuge, partly because of the Kosovo Liberation Army's presence. By 27 March, thousands of Kosovo Albanians from the Drenica region had gathered in Izbica. Most civilians had come after NATO started bombing, when Yugoslav government forces began to shell the surrounding area.

Killings
The shelling of the village of Izbica began during the night of 27 March when a group of at least fifty Yugoslav soldiers, policemen and paramilitaries entered the village. They wore both camouflage and dark blue or black uniforms, and carried long knives. Some wore ski masks and others had their faces blackened with greasepaint.

On 28 March, nearly all of the adult men fled to the mountains, leaving mostly women, children, and old men in the village. In the field of Izbica, thousands of people were crowded that day, almost all women, children, and old people. Only about 150 men were among them. National security forces threatened to kill the villagers and demanded money. After they got the money, they separated the men from the women and children. Women and children were sent to Albania. The men were then executed with automatic weapons. Some women and old men were also executed.

War crime trials

The Izbica killings were cited in the International Criminal Tribunal for the Former Yugoslavia (ICTY) indictment of Slobodan Milošević, and others.

According to Sadik Xhemajli, a KLA fighter from Izbica who recorded the names of victims, 142 Kosovo Albanians from the village were killed between 28 March and 10 May 1999. In 2009, the ICTY ruled that approximately 93 people were killed on 28 March, mostly male civilians between the ages of 60 and 70.

See also

 List of massacres in Yugoslavia
 Drenica massacres
 War crimes in the Kosovo War
 Violence against men

References

Bibliography

1999 in Kosovo
1999 murders in Europe
Anti-Albanian sentiment
Law enforcement in Serbia
March 1999 crimes
March 1999 events in Europe
Massacres in 1999
Massacres in the Kosovo War
Massacres of men
Police brutality in Europe
Serbian war crimes in the Kosovo War
Violence against men in Europe